Nikola II may refer to:

 Nikola II Gorjanski (1367–1433) 
 Nikola II Petrović (born in 1944)

See also

 Nikola Two, a truck from the Nikola Motor Company
 
 Nicholas II (disambiguation)
 Nikola (disambiguation)